John Stillwell Stark (April 11, 1841October 21, 1927) was an American publisher of ragtime music, best known for publishing and promoting the music of Scott Joplin.

Early life and education

Stark was the eleventh of 12 children born to Adin Stark and Eleanor Stillwell Stark of Shelby County, Kentucky. He grew up on a farm in Bean Blossom, Indiana, and served in the Union Army during the American Civil War, where he played the bugle. He married Sarah Ann Casey and raised a family, earning his living as a farmer, first in Indiana and then in Missouri near Maysville. His children were E.J. Stark, who became a well-known composer of ragtime, and Eleanor, who was a talented musician. Eventually John Stark tired of farming and moved to Cameron, where he went into the new business of ice-cream making. After moving to Chillicothe, he supplemented his income by selling organs and pianos.

Career
In 1885, Stark settled in Sedalia, Missouri and entered the music business full-time, opening an office at 516 Ohio Street and founding John Stark and Son with his 15-year-old son William. He got into the publishing business after buying out J.W. Truxel, one of his competitors, who owned seven copyrights.

It was in Sedalia that Stark heard Scott Joplin play the "Maple Leaf Rag", and on August 10, 1899, he bought the number for $50 plus royalties of one cent per copy. It proved a prosperous arrangement for both men. After an initial printing of 5,000 copies, a million were eventually sold, which enabled Stark to open an office in St. Louis, Missouri (and, in 1905, New York City) and Joplin to engage in composing for a living.  Over the next two decades, Stark published and promoted the "classic" style rag pioneered by Joplin and other composers who included Joseph Lamb, James Scott, Arthur Marshall, Paul Pratt, Artie Matthews, Robert Hampton, J. Russel Robinson, and Etilmon J. Stark (his son).

Later life and death
After his wife died in 1910, Stark closed his New York office and returned to St. Louis. By this time New York's Tin Pan Alley was dominating ragtime music sales. He continued to publish new rags until 1922, well after ragtime had succumbed to jazz, which Stark detested. Stark died in St. Louis on October 21, 1927.

Notes

Further reading

1841 births
1927 deaths
American music publishers (people)
American ragtime musicians
People from Sedalia, Missouri
Scott Joplin
Sheet music publishers (people)
Union Army soldiers
People from Shelby County, Kentucky
People from Brown County, Indiana
People from Chillicothe, Missouri
People of Indiana in the American Civil War